Monte Castello di Vibio is a comune (municipality) in the Province of Perugia in the Italian region Umbria, located about 30 km south of Perugia. Monte Castello di Vibio borders the following municipalities: Fratta Todina, San Venanzo, Todi.

It is a medieval, 15th century walled village of central Italy and sits in the Umbrian Hillside above the Tiber Valley. home to the Montecastelesi people.

The surrounding landscape is quilted with vineyards, olive groves and sunflower fields, and stitched in with rows of cypresses and umbrella pines.

Name 
"Monte Castello" or Mountain Castle refers to the medieval fort structure of that villages that was built in the Umbrian hillside, while "Vibio" was added to the name in 1863 by Royal Decree of the King of Italy, Vittorio Emanuele II to distinguish it from other municipalities after the Unification of Italy. "Vibio" likely comes from an ancient, noble family of Perugia, Colonia Vibia Augusta Perusia and Roman emperor Gaius Vibius Trebonianus Gallus.

Places of Interest 

Host to a mix of medieval and renaissance buildings, landmarks and monuments that have been preserved over the centuries. Visitors can enjoy scenic views throughout the village and access to hiking trails within the surrounding valley. Notable sites include:

Teatro Della Concordia 
Built in 1809, Teatro della Concordia is the smallest theatre all'italiana in the world and was designed in the shape of a bell.

Church of Santa Illuminata 
Also known as "The Crucifix" because of the 15th century wooden statue that resides in it. Constructed on a small, pre-existing church in 1839 by the Holy See.The vault was frescoed by Luigi Agretti, who decorated the Teatro Della Concordia in 1892.

Church of the Madonna delle Carceri 
Ancient stone church with fresco decorated interior, erected in 1505 under the name of Madonna delle Grazie.

Church of the Saints Filippo and Giacomo 
Small neoclassical style church erected in 1808 by Mons. Francesco Gazzoli, as the site of    the old sacristy Oratorio del Pio Suffragio. It contains three naves and a semicircular apse. The interior of the church is painted by artists Nicola Benvenuti and Mario Barveris.

Porta Tramontana and Torre di Porta Maggio 
A medieval towers and the two main gates of the wall surrounding the village. Part of the Historical Museum, includes artifacts and heirlooms such as weapons, friezes, noble coats of arms, cadastral maps and other archeological finds from the Roman period. The restored interior and staircase allow access to panoramic views of the Mid-Tiber valley.

Piazza Vittorio Emanuele 
Scenic vantage point that gives panoramic views of southern Umbria, as well as the Lazio and Abruzzo mountains.

Hiking Trails 
Situated above the Tiver Valley, Monte Castello di Vibio has access to the Sistema Territoriale di Interesse Naturalistico Ambientale (S.T.I.N.A.), which includes three protected natural areas in the mountain community of Monte Peglia and Selva di Meana, as well as the Middle Tiber Valley River Park.

International Center for the Arts 
Monte Castello di Vibio is home to the International Center for the Arts. Founded in 1994, the institution hosts artists, researchers, musicians and academics during the summer and fall months each year. Programming includes retreats, workshops, sommelier courses, festivals, performances and other cultural programming to visitors. They have welcomed some of the most respected artists and thinkers in the world, including William Bailey, Andrew Forge, Ruth Miller, Sandro Chia, John Spike and Wayne Thiebaud.

Olive Oil
One of the most appreciated products of Monte Castello di Vibio is olive oil. In fact, this land is inserted in "Extra virgin olive oil DOP Umbria" and the head office is in Trevi. The most part of Montecastello’s hills, from century traditions, are cultivated with care and passion with olive tree.
This tree produces a quality olive oil and is a pleasure feature of landscape.

References

External links
 Official website
Thayer's Gazetteer
 International School of Painting, Drawing, and Sculpture

Hilltowns in Umbria
Cities and towns in Umbria